Nicole Leach (born July 18, 1987) is a former American track and field athlete who competed in the 400 metre hurdles and 4x400 metre relay events at international level events. Her coach was Jeanette Bolden and Bobby Kersee. Her highest achievement is winning two medals at the 2006 World Junior Championships in Athletics in Beijing.

She is also a three time US Junior champion and two-time NCAA champion in the hurdles. She competed at the following international competitions: 2003 IAAF World Youth Championships in Sherbrooke, Canada; 2004 IAAF World Jr. Championships in Grosseto Italy; 2005 Jr. Pan American Games in Windsor, Canada; 2006 IAAF World Jr. Championships in Beijing, China, 2007 Pan American Games in Rio de Janeiro, where she won two bronze medals and the 2007 IAAF World Championships in Osaka, Japan. Nicole also competed in the 2010 IAAF Continental Cup.

References

1987 births
Living people
Sportspeople from Philadelphia
Track and field athletes from Los Angeles
Track and field athletes from Philadelphia
American female hurdlers
American female sprinters
Athletes (track and field) at the 2007 Pan American Games
Pan American Games bronze medalists for the United States
Pan American Games medalists in athletics (track and field)
Medalists at the 2007 Pan American Games
21st-century American women
20th-century American women